The men's 50 kilometre freestyle cross-country skiing competition at the 2014 Sochi Olympics took place on 23 February at Laura Biathlon & Ski Complex.

Summary
Initially, the podium was taken by Alexander Legkov (gold), Maxim Vylegzhanin (silver), and Ilia Chernousov (bronze), all represented Russia. This was the first clean sweep in men's cross-country skiing since 1992, when all medals were won by Norwegians and the first ever for Russia/Soviet Union. 

In November 2017, Legkov and Vylegzhanin were disqualified for doping offences, and their gold and silver medals respectively were stripped. On 1 February 2018, their results were restored as a result of the successful appeal.

Qualification
Athletes with a maximum of 100 FIS distance points (the A standard) were allowed to compete in either the sprint or distance events, or both. Athletes with a maximum 120 FIS sprint points were allowed to compete in the sprint and distance (10 km for women or 15 km for men), provided their distance points did not exceed 300 FIS points. National Olympic Committees who did not have any athletes meeting the A standard could enter one competitor of each gender, known as the basic quota, in only the classical event (10 km for women and 15 km for men). They must have a maximum of 300 FIS distance points at the end of qualifying on 20 January 2014. The qualification period began in July 2012.

Results
The race started at 11:00.

References

Men's cross-country skiing at the 2014 Winter Olympics
Men's 50 kilometre cross-country skiing at the Winter Olympics